s͎ is a symbol used in the Extensions to the International Phonetic Alphabet to represent a whistled s. The sound occurs in the Shona language represented by sv, as in the name of Morgan Tsvangirai.

Unicode
s͎ is represented in Unicode by an s and U+034E (Combining Upwards Arrow Below).

References

Phonetic transcription symbols
Typography